All Saints Episcopal Church, built in 1872–1873, is an historic Carpenter Gothic church in Saugatuck, Michigan. On February 27, 1984, it was added to the National Register of Historic Places.

History
The first Episcopal service in the vicinity of Saugatuck was conducted by Reverend J. Rice Taylor in 1862. The Saugatuck Episcopal congregation was officially organized in 1868. Taylor, who had been assigned to the parish in Holland, Michigan, acted as a missionary minister. The congregation immediately began planning for a church building, and in 1871 purchased the lot that this church sits on. Rev. Taylor was instrumental in raising funds for the church, both within and outside of the parish.

The congregation hired Detroit architect Gordon W. Lloyd to design the new church, and local workmen George Harnes, George E. Dunn, and William Dunning to construct it. Construction began in 1872, and although the church was not yet complete, the first service was held in January 1873. The church was substantially completed by the end of 1874. However, the building was poorly outfitted, and over the next few years, funds were raised to install stained glass windows, carpets, a reed organ, lamps, and seats.

Saugatuck's fortunes declined over the next few decades, as lumbering slowed and the population fell. By 1892, the church entered a period of disuse, lacking a priest and it was vandalized. However, by 1907, Saugatuck had become a popular summering spot, and the church became renewed, regaining a priest. Regular services were once again held in the church, and its infrastructure upgraded The church continues to be used by the Episcopal congregation.

Description
All Saints Episcopal Church is a board-and-batten Gothic Revival structure with a gable roof and tower located on one corner containing the main entrance. The facades have lancet windows.

The interior has pine flooring and a vertical-board, beaded wainscoting. The ceiling is constructed against the underside of the roof, and supported by exposed wooden trusses. The nave has a center aisle with pews on each side.

See also

List of Registered Historic Places in Allegan County, Michigan

References

External links

All Saints Saugatuck website
All Saints Saugatuck history

Churches on the National Register of Historic Places in Michigan
Episcopal church buildings in Michigan
Michigan State Historic Sites
Buildings and structures in Allegan County, Michigan
Carpenter Gothic church buildings in Michigan
Churches completed in 1874
19th-century Episcopal church buildings
National Register of Historic Places in Allegan County, Michigan
Wooden churches in Michigan